Legit is an American sitcom created by Peter O'Fallon and Jim Jefferies.  The series premiered on January 17, 2013, on the American cable television network FX and ended on May 14, 2014, on FX's sister channel FXX. The executive producers were Jefferies, O'Fallon, Rick Cleveland, and Lisa Blum.

On March 28, 2013, Legit was renewed for a second season by FX and moved to FXX.  On May 14, 2014, it was announced that Legit was cancelled due to low ratings and would not return to FXX for a third season.

Cast

Main
 Jim Jefferies as himself – an Australian stand-up comedian who very rarely takes things seriously
 Dan Bakkedahl as Steve Nugent – Jim's best friend and roommate who is suffering from depression after divorcing his wife
 DJ Qualls as Billy Nugent – Steve's vocal, and often cunning muscular dystrophy-afflicted brother who tries to retain as much independence as he still can

Recurring 
 Mindy Sterling as Janice Nugent – Steve and Billy's irritable, controlling and overprotective mother who openly despises Jim
 John Ratzenberger as Walter Nugent – Steve and Billy's unusually laid-back father
 Sonya Eddy as Ramona – Billy's no-nonsense personal nurse
 Magda Szubanski as Anne Jefferies – Jim's mother
 George Lazenby as Jack Jefferies – Jim's father
 Nick Daley as Rodney – Billy's autistic, but gifted and multi-talented friend and former roommate from the care facility
 Ginger Gonzaga as Peggy – Jim's on/off girlfriend
 Arden Myrin as Tess – A sex addict who briefly dates Billy
 Jill Latiano as Katie Knox – Jim's first love
 Andrea Bendewald as Georgia – Steve's ex-wife, and mother of his daughter.

Episodes

Season 1 (2013)

Season 2 (2014)

Broadcast 
In Australia, Legit aired Thursdays on The Comedy Channel.

References

External links 
 

2010s American single-camera sitcoms
2013 American television series debuts
2014 American television series endings
Alcohol abuse in television
Television shows about crime
Cultural depictions of Australian men
Cultural depictions of comedians
Disability and sexuality
Disability in fiction
English-language television shows
Fiction with false allegations of sex crimes
FX Networks original programming
FXX original programming
Gun violence in fiction
Homelessness in popular culture
Midlife crisis in television
Racism in television
Sexual addiction in fiction
Television series about brothers
Television series about dysfunctional families
Television series about comedians
Television shows about disability
Television shows set in Los Angeles
Unemployment in fiction
Venice, Los Angeles
Virginity in television